The WWS-2 Żaba (Frog) was a single-seat training glider designed and built in Poland from  1937.

Development 
Czerwiński improved the design of the CWJ-bis, with reduced structure weight and changes to the flying control surfaces, to improve performance and manoeuvrability. The W.W.S. 2 followed the primary trainer concept with a skeletal fuselage wire-braced to a simple fabric covered wing, supported by two struts each side, and tail unit. The completely open seating area followed the theory of the day, that called for the student pilot to feel the wind on his/her body to fully appreciate the movements of the aircraft in response to control movements and atmospheric changes, such as gusts, turbulence or thermals. One W.W.S. 2 survived the war, to fly again, and was retired to the Kraków Aviation Museum in 1950.

Production of the  Żaba at  the W.W.S. Commenced in 1937, with 60-70 built before the outbreak of World War II. The  Żaba II (Żaba-bis) was produced at the Lwow aviation workshops (L.W.L.), with approx 150 built, 20 for export.

Variants 
 WWS-2 Żaba – production aircraft from W.W.S. From 1937.
 WWS-2-bis Żaba II – improved version with reduced weight and improved controls built by the Lwow Aviation Workshops (L.W.L.).
 CWA Wren – A  WWS-2 Żaba built in Canada, after WWII, by Wacław Czerwiński.

Specifications (WWS-2 Żaba)

See also

References

  Taylor, J. H. (ed) (1989) Jane's Encyclopedia of Aviation. Studio Editions: London. p. 29
Simons, Martin. Sailplanes 1920-1945 2nd revised edition. EQIP Werbung und Verlag G.m.b.H.. Königswinter. 2006. 
Cynk, Jerzy B. “Polish Aircraft 1893 – 1939”. London, Putnam. 1971.

External links
http://www.piotrp.de/SZYBOWCE/pwws2.htm
http://muzeumlotnictwa.pl/zbiory_sz.php?ido=79&w=p

1930s Polish sailplanes
High-wing aircraft
Aircraft first flown in 1937